Salford City Reds competed in their eleventh Super League season in their 137th year. They also competed in the 2009 Challenge Cup.

Transfers
Transfers for 2009 (In)

Transfers for 2009 (Out)

Full squad

Fixtures and results

Note A: Match between Salford City Reds and Catalans Dragons was postponed to 7 August 2009 due to a test between England and France in Paris over the same weekend, in which ten Catalans players were involved.

League table

External links
 Salford City Reds' official website

References

Salford Red Devils seasons
Salford City Reds season